The Maltan is a river in Magadan Oblast, Russia. The Maltan is the longest tributary of the Bakhapcha, of the Kolyma basin.

The river flows across an uninhabited area, the nearest village is Sinegorye, located to the north. 
The name of the river originated in an Even word for "bend" or "curvature".

Course
The source of the Maltan is in the northern slopes of Mount Nukh (Гора Нух) of the Olsky Plateau area, at the western end of the Kolyma Mountains, close to the R504 Kolyma Highway. It flows near Atka in its upper course, not far from the sources of the Yama. The river heads in a NNW direction along the western slopes of the Maymandzhin Range. Finally it turns to the WNW below the southern slopes of Mount Khetinskaya (Гора Хетинская) and joins the right bank of the Bakhapcha  from its mouth in the Kolyma.

The river freezes yearly between late October and late May.

Tributaries

See also
List of rivers of Russia

References

External links
Гора Нух (Луковая гора) (in Russian)
Хасынский район - Активный отдых для энергичных людей Tourist routes (in Russian)

Rivers of Magadan Oblast